Boonea scymnocelata is a species of sea snail, a marine gastropod mollusk in the family Pyramidellidae, the pyrams and their allies. The species is one of eleven known species within the Boonea genus of gastropods.

Description
The shell of this ectoparasitic marine species grows to a length of approximately 2 mm.

Distribution
This marine species occurs off the coasts of Brazil at depths between 79 m and 500 m below sea level.

References

External links
 To Encyclopedia of Life
 To World Register of Marine Species

Pyramidellidae
Gastropods described in 2009